WCFI was a commercial radio station in Ocala, Florida, broadcasting to the Gainesville-Ocala, Florida area on 1290 AM. WCFI broadcast news and talk programming, along with country music. The station's slogan was "News, Information, and Real Country". WCFI's transmitter tower was severely damaged during the 2004 hurricane season, and the station has been off the air since August 2004. On February 20, 2008, the FCC license for the station was deleted.

External links
History of 1290 AM from Central Florida Radio
FCC Data on WCFI

CFI
Defunct radio stations in the United States
2008 disestablishments in Florida
Radio stations disestablished in 2008
CFI
Radio stations established in 1939
1939 establishments in Florida